Cecilia Robinson may refer to:
 Cecilia Robinson (cricketer)
 Cecilia Robinson (entrepreneur)